Zaitunia is a genus of crevice weavers that was first described by Pekka T. Lehtinen in 1967.

Species
 it contains 28 species:
Zaitunia afghana (Roewer, 1962) – Afghanistan
Zaitunia akhanii Marusik & Zamani, 2015 – Iran
Zaitunia alexandri Brignoli, 1982 – Iran
Zaitunia annulipes (Kulczyński, 1908) – Cyprus
Zaitunia beshkentica (Andreeva & Tyschchenko, 1969) – Tajikistan
Zaitunia brignoliana Zonstein & Marusik, 2016 – Iran
Zaitunia darreshurii Zamani & Marusik, 2018 – Iran
Zaitunia ferghanensis Zonstein & Marusik, 2016 – Kyrgyzstan, Uzbekistan
Zaitunia feti Zonstein & Marusik, 2016 – Turkmenistan
Zaitunia halepensis Zonstein & Marusik, 2016 – Syria
Zaitunia huberi Zonstein & Marusik, 2016 – Afghanistan
Zaitunia inderensis Ponomarev, 2005 – Kazakhstan
Zaitunia kunti Zonstein & Marusik, 2016 – Cyprus, Turkey
Zaitunia logunovi Zonstein & Marusik, 2016 – Kazakhstan, Kyrgyzstan
Zaitunia maracandica (Charitonov, 1946) – Uzbekistan
Zaitunia martynovae (Andreeva & Tyschchenko, 1969) – Tajikistan
Zaitunia medica Brignoli, 1982 – Iran
Zaitunia minoica Zonstein & Marusik, 2016 – Greece (Crete)
Zaitunia minuta Zonstein & Marusik, 2016 – Uzbekistan
Zaitunia persica Brignoli, 1982 – Iran
Zaitunia psammodroma Zonstein & Marusik, 2016 – Turkmenistan
Zaitunia rufa (Caporiacco, 1934) – Pakistan, India
Zaitunia schmitzi (Kulczyński, 1911) (type) – Egypt, Israel
Zaitunia spinimana Zonstein & Marusik, 2016 – Kazakhstan, Turkmenistan
Zaitunia vahabzadehi Zamani & Marusik, 2016 – Iran
Zaitunia wunderlichi Zonstein & Marusik, 2016 – Kyrgyzstan
Zaitunia zagrosica Zamani & Marusik, 2018 – Iran
Zaitunia zonsteini Fomichev & Marusik, 2013 – Kazakhstan

References

Araneomorphae genera
Filistatidae
Spiders of Asia
Taxa named by Pekka T. Lehtinen